Longguan, formerly known as Longmen, is a town in Chicheng County in northwestern Hebei Province, China, situated along China National Highway 112 around  east of downtown Zhangjiakou and  southwest of the county seat as the crow flies. , it has 35 villages under its administration.

History

Under the name Longmen, the town was formerly the seat of a county under the administration of Xuanhua Prefecture during imperial times.

See also 
 List of township-level divisions of Hebei

References 

Township-level divisions of Hebei